is a Japanese football player, who currently plays for Shibuya City.

Career
Shibamura previously played for Avispa Fukuoka, Tokushima Vortis and Gainare Tottori in the J. League. In March, 2011 he signed a contract with the Latvian Higher League club FK Ventspils for one season. 2012 he signed a contract with the Uzbek Higher League club FC Pakhtakor Tashkent, and become first Japan player in Uzbekistan.

Club statistics
Updated to 23 February 2018.

Awards and honours

Club
FK Ventspils
Latvian Higher League: 1
 2011

Latvian Football Cup: 1
 2010-11

References

External links

Profile at Ventforet Kofu

1982 births
Living people
Chuo University alumni
Association football people from Hiroshima Prefecture
Japanese footballers
Japanese expatriate footballers
Association football defenders
Albirex Niigata Singapore FC players
Avispa Fukuoka players
Tokushima Vortis players
Gainare Tottori players
Fujieda MYFC players
FK Ventspils players
Pakhtakor Tashkent FK players
Buxoro FK players
OKS Stomil Olsztyn players
Ventforet Kofu players
Singapore Premier League players
J1 League players
J2 League players
Japan Football League players
I liga players
Uzbekistan Super League players
Japanese expatriate sportspeople in Singapore
Japanese expatriate sportspeople in Latvia
Japanese expatriate sportspeople in Poland
Expatriate footballers in Singapore
Expatriate footballers in Latvia
Expatriate footballers in Uzbekistan
Expatriate footballers in Poland